On 2 February 2022, a power cable collapsed in Kinshasa, Democratic Republic of the Congo, killing 26 people. The accident occurred at a market in Matadi-Kibala on the outskirts of the capital of the DRC. The cable fell onto houses and shoppers, with the live end landing in a ditch that was filled with rain from earlier in the day. The country's national electricity company said that it believed the cable broke because it had been hit by lightning.

Kinshasa's governor  promised to pass new laws prohibiting "anarchic construction" in response to the tragedy. The government paid and arranged for the victims' funerals.

References

2022 disasters in the Democratic Republic of the Congo
2022 in the Democratic Republic of the Congo

Power cable collapse

February 2022 events in Africa
Man-made disasters in the Democratic Republic of the Congo